Thomas Michael Coleman (born January 3, 1951) is an American bass player of bluegrass and folk music. He is best known for work with Doc Watson and the Seldom Scene.

Biography

Doc Watson
Coleman grew up in Mayodan, North Carolina, graduating from Madison-Mayodan High School in 1969 where he was a part of bluegrass and folk groups. After working as a sound technician each time Doc Watson came to nearby Appalachian State University, Coleman played bass with Doc Watson and his son Merle starting in 1974 and continuing until 1986. Coleman also toured with Doc Watson and David Holt during the final three years of Doc's life.

Seldom Scene
After his time with Watson, Coleman joined the Seldom Scene, replacing Tom Gray. Coleman was with The Seldom Scene from 1986 until 1995. There were initial objections to Coleman's use of an electric bass in the normally acoustic bluegrass lineup, but Coleman's playing fit the group's sound.

Chesapeake
After leaving the Seldom Scene, Coleman joined Chesapeake with Moondi Klein, Mike Auldridge, and Jimmy Gaudreau. They released three albums on the Sugar Hill label. With no banjo, they were more acoustic country than bluegrass. Chesapeake disbanded in 1999 when their contract with Sugar Hill ended.

Sutton, Holt & Coleman
In 2013, Coleman recorded the album Ready for the Times with Bryan Sutton and David Holt. They recorded the album as a tribute to Doc Watson. The trio got together in 2011, and have performed frequently under the name Deep River Rising.

Pocket

Released in 2016, Pocket was Coleman's first album. Contributors included Alan Bibey, Sam Bush, Kelen Coleman, Jerry Douglas, Buddy Greene, Lamar Hill, David Holt, Rob Ickes, Jens Kruger, Jack Lawrence, Jeff Little, Pat McInerney, Stephen Mougin, Herb Pedersen, Allen Shadd, Bryan Sutton, Doc Watson, and Tony Williamson.

Awards

Projects that Coleman was involved with were nominated five times for a Grammy Award: once in 1982, twice in 1998, once in 1982, and once in 1994.

Personal life
Coleman is a videographer and film maker, known for his work on Children of Armageddon (2008), Broke: The New American Dream (2009), and Inside the Afghanistan War (2012). Coleman's daughter is actress Kelen Coleman.

Discography

Solo albums
 2016: Pocket (Chesterbury)

With Sutton, Holt, and Coleman
 2013: Ready for the Times (High Windy)

With Doc Watson
 1975: Memories (United Artists)
 1976: Doc and the Boys (United Artists)
 1977: Lonesome Road (United Artists)
 1978: Look Away! (United Artists)
 1979: Live and Pickin' (United Artists)
 1980: Reflections (RCA)
 1981: Red Rocking Chair (Flying Fish)
 1983: Doc and Merle Watson's Guitar Album (Flying Fish)
 1984: Down South (Flying Fish)
 1985: Pickin' the Blues (Flying Fish)
 1986: Riding the Midnight Train (Sugar Hill)
 1987: Portrait (Sugar Hill)
 1990: On Praying Ground (Sugar Hill)
 1991: My Dear Old Southern Home (Sugar Hill)
 1992: Remembering Merle (Sugar Hill)
 1995: Docabilly (Sugar Hill)
 1999: Third Generation Blues (Sugar Hill)
 2002: Round the Table Again (Sugar Hill)

With The Seldom Scene
 1988: A Change of Scenery (Sugar Hill)
 1990: Scenic Roots (Sugar Hill)
 1992: Scene 20: 20th Anniversary Concert (Sugar Hill)
 1994: Like We Used to Be (Sugar Hill)

With Chesapeake
 1994: Rising Tide (Sugar Hill)
 1995: Full Sail (Sugar Hill)
 1997: Pier Pressure (Sugar Hill)
 2014: Hook, Live & Sinker (Chesterbury) compilation of live performances

With Mike Auldridge and Lou Reid
 1989: High Time (Sugar Hill)

As composer
 1981: Doc and Merle Watson - Red Rocking Chair (Flying Fish Records) - track 1, "Sadie" (co-written with Byron Hill)
 1988: Jack McDuff - The Re-Entry (Muse) - track 2, "One Hundred Years" (co-written with B.J. Wright)
 1993: Lou Reid - Carolina Blue (Webco) - track 4, "Oh Lord Have Mercy (On My Soul)" (co-written with Lou Reid)
 1996: Doc and Merle Watson - Watson County (Flying Fish Records) - track 15, "Sadie" (co-written with Byron Hill)
 2006: Doc and Merle Watson - Black Mountain Rag (Rounder Records) - track 11, "Sadie" (co-written with Byron Hill)
 2010: Lou Reid and Carolina - Sounds Like Heaven To Me (Rural Rhythm) - track 13, "Oh Lord Have Mercy (On My Soul)" (co-written with Lou Reid)
 2011: Lonesome Highway - Got Away with Murder (CD Baby) - track 5, "Red Georgia Clay" (co-written with Lou Reid)
 2015: Jamie Harper - Old Pal (Mountain Fever) - track 8, "Her Memories Bound to Ride" (co-written with Lou Reid)

As producer
 1988: Robin and Linda Williams - All Broken Hearts Are the Same (Sugar Hill)
 1989: The Smith Sisters - Roadrunner (Flying Fish)

Also appears on
 1976: Mike Auldridge - Mike Auldridge (Flying Fish)
 1976: Gove Scrivenor - Shady Gove (Flying Fish)
 1979: Gove Scrivenor - Coconut Gove (Flying Fish)
 1980: Curly Seckler and Nashville Grass - Take a Little Time (CMH)
 1982: Marty Stuart - Busy Bee Cafe (Sugar Hill)
 1983: Dan Crary - Guitar (Sugar Hill)
 1984: The Smith Sisters - Bluebird (Flying Fish)
 1986: Johnny Cash - Believe in Him (Word)
 1986: The Smith Sisters - Mockingbird (Flying Fish)
 1986: Marty Stuart - Marty Stuart (Columbia)
 1990: Mike Auldridge - Treasures Untold (Sugar Hill)
 1992: Marty Stuart - Let There Be Country (Columbia)
 2003: The Chieftains - Further Down the Old Plank Road (Victor / Arista)

References

External links 
 
 
 
 

Living people
1951 births
Bluegrass musicians from North Carolina
20th-century American bass guitarists
People from Eden, North Carolina
Country musicians from North Carolina
The Seldom Scene members